Paula J Rudall (born 1954) is a British botanist, who was head of the Department of Comparative Plant and Fungal Biology at the Royal Botanic Gardens, Kew.

Career 
Paula Rudall graduated from the University of London, with a B.Sc., and went on to get her Ph.D. and D.Sc. (2001) at the same institution. She was the head of the Department of Comparative Plant and Fungal Biology at the Royal Botanic Gardens, Kew and has been the recipient of a number of awards including the Linnean Medal (2005). She is known for her work on the taxonomy and phylogeny of monocotyledons.

Features in Sir Richard Attenborough’s documentary ‘Lost Gods of Easter Island’

References

Bibliography

External links 
 Personal Webpage
 Publications on ResearchGate

British botanists
1954 births
Living people